Ładzice  is a village in Radomsko County, Łódź Voivodeship, in central Poland. It is the seat of the gmina (administrative district) called Gmina Ładzice.

The village has a population of 470. The village also neighbours Radziechowice Drugie, Kozia Woda and the city of Radomsko.

References

Villages in Radomsko County